Selma Augusta Maria Andersson (21 October 1894 – 6 April 1993) was a Swedish diver.  She competed in the 10 m platform at the 1912 and 1920 Summer Olympics and finished seventh in 1912.  Her brothers Adolf, Erik, and Robert were Olympic swimmers and water polo players.

References

1894 births
1993 deaths
Swedish female divers
Olympic divers of Sweden
Divers at the 1912 Summer Olympics
Divers at the 1920 Summer Olympics
Stockholms KK divers
Divers from Stockholm
19th-century Swedish women
20th-century Swedish women